Ron Balicki (born September 2, 1963) is an American actor and stuntman for various films and television series. He is also a well known martial arts practitioner, teacher and author. He is a student and the son-in-law of Dan Inosanto.

Biography
Balicki grew up in Chicago, Illinois. In 1987 he became a Deputy Sheriff for Cook County, Illinois. He helped form a "Special Operations Resistance Team" which trained officers in riot control. Around this time he served as bodyguard for Hollywood movie and music stars including Steven Seagal, Public Enemy, Kid 'n Play, Queen Latifah and D.J. Jazzy Jeff and Will Smith. On December 6, 1995, he married Diana Lee Inosanto, daughter of Dan Inosanto. They have two sons.

Martial arts
Balicki began training in the martial arts in the late 1960s, and in 1982 began studying with Dan Inosanto. Balicki earned his full instructor certification under Inosanto in the arts of Maphilindo Silat, Filipino Kali, and Jun Fan Gung Fu (Jeet Kune Do concepts). In addition, Balicki also trained CRCA Wing Chun with Sifu Randy Williams.

Balicki served as stunt coordinator and fight choreographer on many film projects (see "filmography" section below). He and his wife choreographed martial arts for the stage production, Be Like Water, produced at East West Players in 2008, which features the ghost of Bruce Lee visiting a troubled teenage Asian American tomboy, offering her lessons and guidance.

Law enforcement
Balicki has traveled extensively to train Military and Paramilitary organizations from the DEA to local law enforcement agencies, including Navy Seals, Anti-terrorists, the French Secret Service and Homeland Security personnel.

Martial arts studies
Balicki has studied under the following martial arts masters:
Dan Inosanto: Jun Fan Jeet Kune Do, Filipino Kali, Maphilindo Silat, Thai Boxing
Yorinaga Nakamura: Shoot wrestling
Edgar Sulite: Lameco Escrima
Nicolas Saignac: Savate
Anthony De Longis: Bullwhip
Leo Giron: Bahala Na Eskrima
Tom Meadows: Latigo y Daga (Whip and Dagger)
Chai Sirisute: Muay Thai
Randy Williams: Wing Chun
Fred Degerberg: Degerberg Blend Thai Boxing
Pete Cruz: Degerberg Blend
Herman Suwanda: Mande Muda (Pencak silat)
Paul DeThouras: Bakti Negara
Victor DeThouras: Serak Silat
Larry Lindenmann: Jun Fan Jeet Kune Do, Filipino Kali
Christopher Ricketts - Edgar Sulite: Bakbakan Eskrima

He has earned instructorships in:
Jun Fan Jeet Kune Do
Filipino Martial Arts\Kali
Maphilindo Silat
Muay Thai
Savate
Lameco Escrima
Degerberg Blend (8th Degree Black Belt)
Wing Chun
Latigo y daga (whip fighting)
Shoot wrestling

Professional fighting
Balicki competed in America and Japan in "Vale Tudo" matches (No holds barred) fighting tournaments.  As a professional Shoot Wrestler, he holds the title of "Shooter" (Professional Fighter) under Yorinaga Nakamura.
Balicki won the 1996 Southern California Boxe Française Savate Championship Tournament.
Balicki is a 4 time knife fighting Champion in the Cold Steel Challenge weapons fighting tournament.
Balicki is a 2 time sword fighting Champion in the Cold Steel Challenge weapons fighting tournament.

Mixed martial arts record

|-
|Win
| align=center| 1-1
| Tomoaki Hayama
| Decision (Unanimous)
| Shooto - Reconquista 1
| 
| align=center| 3
| align=center| 3:00
| Tokyo, Japan
| 
|-
| Loss
| align=center| 0-1
| Rumina Sato
| Technical Submission (Armbar)
| Shooto - Complete Vale Tudo Access
| 
| align=center| 1
| align=center| 2:14
| Omiya, Saitama, Japan
|

Publications

Books
Ron Balicki / Dr. Steven Gold. Jeet Kune Do: The Principles of a Complete Fighter. Brooklyn, New York: HNL Publishing, 2000.

Article
"Variety" (USA), July 10, 2005, Vol. 399, Iss. 6, pg. 63, by: Dennis Harvey, "The Prodigy"
"Inside Kung Fu" (USA), December 2004, Vol. 32, Iss. 12, pg. 127, by: David Tadman, "Instructor Profile: Ron Balicki"
"Ceinture Noire" (France), November 2004, Vol. 36, Iss. 11, pg. 44, 45, by: Ceinture Norie, "Diana Lee Inosanto et Ron Balicki Ou L'heritage Du Jeet Kune Do"
"Inside Kung Fu" (USA), September 2004, Vol. 32, Iss. 9, pg. 90, 91, 92, 93, 94, by: Ron Balicki, "The Fighting Sarong"
"Martial Arts Legends" (USA), March 2000, Vol. 18, Iss. 3, pg. 18, 19, 20, 21, 22, 23, 24, 25, by: Ron Balicki, "The Focus Mitts JF/JKD's Most Versatile Weapon"
"World of Martial Arts" (USA), August 1999, Vol. 10, Iss. 8, pg. 15, 16, 17, by: Ron Balicki, "The use of patterns in the art of Kali & Pencak Silat"
"Budo International" (France), May 1999, Vol. 19, Iss. 10, pg. 60, 61, 62, 63, by: Ron Balicki & Joaquin Almeria, "Shoot Wrestling"
"World of Martial Arts", December 1998, Vol. 9, Iss. 12, pg. 80, 81, 82, 83, by: Ron Balicki, "Getting to the point before it gets to you"
"World of Martial Arts", October 1998, Vol. 9, Iss. 10, pg. 67, 68, 69, by: Helen Miller, "Rise to the Shoot World"
"Inside Kung Fu", August 1997, Vol. 24, Iss. 8, pg. 8, by: Ron Balicki, "Insiders"
"El Budoka" (Spain), 1996, Vol. 247, Iss. 5, pg. 9, 10, 11, by: Joaquin Almeria, "Jeet Kune Do Ron Balicki Interview"
"El Budoka", May 1995, Vol. 238, Iss. 4, pg. 27, 28, 29, by: Ron Balicki & Joaquin Almeria, "Shoot Wrestling"
"El Budoka", March 1995, Vol. 231, Iss. 4, pg. 35, 36, 37, 38, 39, by: Joaquin Almeria, "Jeet Kune Do"

Pictorial
"Inside Kung-Fu", 1 September 2004, Vol. 32, Iss. 9, pg. 90, 91, 92, 93, 94, by: Ron Balicki, "The Fighting Sarong"

Magazine cover photo
"Inside Kung Fu", February 2000, Vol. 27, Iss. 2
"MA Success" (USA), February 2004

Periodicals
MA SUCCESS (cover/article)
Inside Kung Fu (article)

Filmography

Film and television work
"The Island"* (2022) 2nd Unit Director / Fight Coordinator / Stunt Coordinator / (Stunt Double: Jackson Rathbone) / MSR Media / Shaun Piccinino
"Lights Out"* (2022) Stuntman / Firebrand / Christian Sesma
"The Book of Boba Fett"* (2022) Stunts / Lucas Films / Robert Rodriguez
"Insight"* (2021) Fight Coordinator / Stunts / Stellar Films / Livi Zheng
"General Commander"* (2017) 2nd Unit Director / Fight Coordinator / Stunt Coordinator / Saradanm Media / Philippe Martinez
"Contract to Kill"* (2016) 2nd Unit Director / Fight Coordinator / Action House Pictures / Keoni Waxman
"The Last Ship"* (2016) Role: Alizan / Channel Road Productions
"Insight* (2014) Fight Choreographer / Stellar Films / Livi Zheng
"Absolution"* (2014) Stunts / Steamroller Prod / Keoni Waxman
"The Drakken* (2014) Fight Coordinator / Stunt Coordinator / Character - Merauder #1 / Matt Wilson
"A Good Man* (2013) 2nd Unit Director / Fight Coordinator / Character - Polanski / Steamroller Prod / Keoni Waxman
"Daylight's End'* (2013) Fight/Stunt Coordinator / Stunts Double Lance Henriksen  / Throttle Films / Will Kafuman
"The Beautiful Ones'* (2013) CO-fight Coordinator / Stunts Double Ross McCall  / First look Prod / Jesse V. johnson
"Force of Execution'* (2013) Stunts / Ernest (One Shovel) / Stunts / Steamroller Prod / Keoni Waxman
"The Exchange'* (2013) Stunts / (role: Money)
"Sony HMZ-T2" (2012) (Stunt Coordinator)
"The Last Tour" (2012) (Stunt Coordinator) (Co Producer) (Role: Uncle Bob)
"I, Frankenstein" (2012) (Martial Arts Trainer - Aaron Eckhart / Socratis Otto)
"Level 7" (2011) (Stunt Coordinator)
"Punk'd" (2011) (Stunt)
"Should've Been Romeo" (2010) (Stunt Coordinator)
"Hit List (2010 film)" (Stunts)
"Big Time Rush" (2010) (Stunts)
"Game of Death (2010 film)" (Stunt) (Role: Jimmy)
"War of the Ages" (2010) (Stunt Coordinator / Fight Coordinator)
"Sinners and Saints (2010 film)" (Producer) (Stunt Coordinator) (Role: Rucker)
"Tainted Hearts" (2009) (Stunt Coordinator)
"Highway Hunters" (2009) (Stunt Coordinator)
"The Dark Path Chronicles" (2009) (Stunt Coordinator)
"The Cursed" (2010) (Stunt Coordinator) (Stunt Double: Louis Mandylor) (Co Producer)
"The Sensei" (2009) (Stunt Coordinator) (Executive Producer) (Role: Frank)
"The Prodigy" (2008) (Stunt Coordinator) Fight Choreographer) (Role: Frank) (Stunt Double: Rains) (Associate Producer)
"Just Legal" (2005) TV Series (Stunts)
"Julias Home" (2005) (Stunt Coordinator)
"Star Trek: Enterprise"  (2003) (2004) (2005) TV Series (Stunts)
"Ned's Declassified School Survival Guide" (2004) TV Series (Stunts)
"Fist of Cheese" (2004) TV Series (Stunt Coordinator) (Associate Producer) (Role: Hoodie)
"Resident Evil: Apocalypse" (2004) (Fight Coordinator) trainer: Milla Jovovich
"The Best Damn Sports Show Period" - (Stunts) (2004)
"Drake & Josh" (2004) TV Series (Stunt Rigger)
"Redemption" (2002) (V) (Stunts)
"A Ribbon of Dreams" (2002) (Associate Producer)
"Alias" (2001) TV Series (Stunts) Multiple Episodes
"Point Doom" (2001) (Stunts)
"Modern Warriors" (2000) Himself
"Life Streams" (2000) (Stunt Coordinator) (Fight Choreography)
"No Tomorrow" (1999) (Stunts)
"The Roseanne Show" (1998) TV Series (Stunts)
"3 Ninjas: High Noon at Mega Mountain" (1998) (Stunts) (Role: Big Dawg)
"The Cutoff" (1998) (assistant stunt coordinator) (Stunt Double) Winner: Action Film Festival
"Buffy the Vampire Slayer" (1997) TV Series (Stunts)
"Spy Game" (1997) TV Series (Stunts)
"Money Talks" (1997) (French Terrorist)
"Spawn" (1997) Cop
"JAG" (1996) Soldier
"The Rock" (1996) Soldier
"The Glimmer Man" (1996) (Stunts)
"Barb Wire" (1996) (Fight Trainer: Temuera Morrison) (Stunts)
"Second Skin" (1996) (Stunt Coordinator)
"MTV New Edition Music Video "Hit Me Off" - (Stunt Coordinator) (1996)
"Dear God" (1996) Cop
"Sword of Honor" (1996) (V) (Stunts)
"The Burning Zone" (1995) Soldier
"Mars Attacks" (1995) Military Captain
"Surface to Air" (1995) POW
"Mighty Morphin' Power Rangers" (1993) TV Series (Martial Arts) (Stunts)
"Biography "The Life of Bruce Lee" (1993) (Martial Artist)
"Fate of the Dragon" - (Stunt Coordinator) (1993)
"Defender" - (Stunts) (1993)

Actor
A Good Man (2013)
The Last Tour (2013)
Force of Execution (2013)
Sinners & Saints (2009)
The Sensei (2008)
The Prodigy (2004)
3 Ninjas: High Noon at Mega Mountain (1998)
Barb Wire (1996)

Training videos
"Close Range Combat Wing Chun Series" by Randy Williams (1987) (Ron Balicki Martial Arts Assistant) Producer)
"Espada "Y" Daga" by Edgar Sulite (1993) (Ron Balicki Martial Arts Assistant)
"The Defensive Edge Series" (1995) (Ron Balicki Martial Arts Instructor / Author)  Producer)
"The Explosive Art of Penchak Silat Serak" by Victor DeThouars (1999) (Ron Balicki Martial Arts Assistant) Producer
"The Warrior's Edge Knife Fighting Series" (2002) (Ron Balicki Martial Arts Assistant) Producer)
"Blitzing Sticks" by Victor DeThouars (2003) (Ron Balicki Martial Arts Assistant for Dan Inosanto)
"Stun Stagger and Stop Series" (2004) (Ron Balicki Martial Arts Assistant) Producer
"The Fighting Sarong Series" (2005) (Ron Balicki Martial Arts Instructor) / Author, Producer
"Jun Fan Jeet Kune Do Instructor Series" (2004) (Ron Balicki Martial Arts Instructor / Author) Producer
"Fighting with the Sjambok Series" (2005) (Ron Balicki Co-Martial Arts Instructor / Author) Producer
"Filipino Boxing Series" (2006) (Ron Balicki Martial Arts Instructor / Author) Producer

References

External links
RonBalicki.com - official site

1963 births
Living people
American eskrimadors
American male film actors
American Jeet Kune Do practitioners
American Wing Chun practitioners
American Muay Thai practitioners
American savateurs
Ron Balicki
Mixed martial artists utilizing Jeet Kune Do
Mixed martial artists utilizing Wing Chun
Mixed martial artists utilizing Muay Thai
Mixed martial artists utilizing savate
Mixed martial artists utilizing wrestling
American stunt performers